Dewi Rezer (born 29 September 1980) is an Indonesian actress, presenter and model.

Biography
She is the eldest of four children to Nurdiati and Yotin Rezer. Rezer's ancestry is a combination of Indonesian and French. While her mother is Betawi, her father is French.

Her career began in 1995, when she became a model posing for the Indonesian magazine Gadis Sampul. Rezer then begin to appear in fashion shows as a teenager until the early 2000s. Rezer has since removed the modeling, for become an actress. She made her first appearance in film in 2003 in the comedy Rumah Ketujuh, alongside the actor Indra Birowo.

Dewi Rezer's married with actor Marcellino Lefrandt in Bali on 18 July 2007. She gave birth to her daughter, Marcelle Renee Brinette Lefrandt on 21 December 2007. She has since given birth to a son, Leopold Lefrandt Jarvis on 11 October 2012.

Filmography

Feature films 
 Rumah Ketujuh (Seventh House; 2003)
 Buruan Cium Gue (Kiss me; 2004)
 Potong Bebek Angsa (Cut the duck goose; 2012)
 Geez and Ann (2021)
 Pontien (Pontianak Untold Story) (Pontien (Pontianak untold story); Filming)

Television appearances 
 Satu Lagi Persembahan untuk Pecinta (One more offerings for lovers; 2004)
 Ciuman ABG (ABG of the Kiss; 2007)
 Ramalan Alisa (Alisa forecast; 2011)
 4 Diva (4 Diva; 2013)
 Mengejar Jodoh (Pursuing; 2013)
 Wakuncar (Wakuncar; 2014)
 Belenggu Dua Hati (Shackle of two heart; 2020)

External links
  Official Website
 
  Profil Dewi Rezer Kapanlagi.com
  Bio Dewi Rezer Wowkeren.com

References 

1980 births
Indonesian female models
People from Jakarta
Indonesian film actresses
21st-century Indonesian actresses
Indonesian television actresses
Indonesian television presenters
Living people
Indo people
Betawi people
Indonesian people of French descent
Indonesian former Muslims
Indonesian Roman Catholics
Converts to Roman Catholicism from Islam
Indonesian women television presenters